The Johnny Maestro Story is a compilation of songs recorded by Johnny Maestro with The Crests and The Brooklyn Bridge.

Track listing
The Crests
"16 Candles "
"Step By Step"
"Angels Listened In"
"Six Nights a Week"
"What a Surprise"

The Brooklyn Bridge
"Worst That Could Happen"
"Blessed is the Rain"
"Welcome Me Love"
"The Love's Still Growing"
"Wednesday in Your Garden"
"Your Husband, My Wife"

References

Johnny Maestro & the Brooklyn Bridge albums
1971 albums
Buddah Records compilation albums